Andrea Fonseka (born 29 August 1984) is a Filipino-Malaysian model, television presenter, actress and beauty pageant titleholder who was crowned Miss Universe Malaysia 2004. As an actress, she is currently working predominantly in Malaysia and Singapore.

Personal life
Andrea Fonseka was born in Penang, Malaysia, on 29 August 1984. She is of mixed ethnic heritage. Her father is of Sinhalese (Sri Lankan), Portuguese, Spanish, and Filipino descent, while her mother is of Chinese descent. She is the youngest of four daughters and currently lives and works between Singapore, Malaysia and Australia. She studied at SMK(P) Taman Petaling (Taman Petaling Girls' National Secondary School) in Petaling Jaya during her secondary school years. She also holds a Bachelor of Laws from the National University of Singapore.

Fonseka married an Australian lawyer Paul Dewar on 31 July 2010, in Kuala Lumpur.

Career
Fonseka first came to the public's attention when she hosted the first season of Xfresh.tv, a teen program produced by Malaysia's Astro TVIQ.

In 2004, Andrea followed her mother's footsteps and won the Miss Malaysia Universe title. She subsequently represented Malaysia in Miss Universe 2004, in Ecuador. After the pageant, Andrea relocated to Singapore to study Law at the National University of Singapore. She graduated with a Bachelor of Laws from NUS in 2008. Shortly after moving to Singapore, Andrea became an ambassador for Marie France Bodyline and appeared on numerous magazine covers, including FHM Singapore.

This exposure led her to becoming a host on ESPN's Score Today and then suitcase girl number 10 in Deal or No Deal on Mediacorp Channel 5. Following the success of Deal or No Deal, Channel 5 invited Andrea to co-host the live TV singing contest Live The Dream with Utt and Michelle Chia.

Andrea subsequently moved into acting, starring in small parts in Maggi & Me and Parental Guidance, and then landing major roles in Housemates, the channel 5 drama En Bloc and the feature film Carrotcake Conversations.

Andrea was voted the world's sexiest woman in FHM Singapore's 100 Sexiest Women in the World for 2007. She won No.1 ranking for the second time in 2008, making her the first repeat winner for FHM's Top 100 Sexiest.

2009–present
Andrea was inducted into the Miss Malaysia Universe Hall of Fame in 2009, recognizing her success and contribution in the regional entertainment industry. In 2010, Fonseka became the Face of the Malaysia International Fashion Week, and fronting the Fashion-TV program.

Fonseka was the National Director for Miss Universe Malaysia from 2010 until 2013.

Filmography

Notes

External links
 

1984 births
Living people
Malaysian beauty pageant winners
Malaysian people of Chinese descent
Malaysian people of Filipino descent
Malaysian people of Portuguese descent
Malaysian people of Spanish descent
Malaysian people of Sri Lankan descent
Malaysian people of Kristang descent
Miss Universe 2004 contestants
National University of Singapore alumni
People from Penang